Proprietors: Kammath & Kammath  is a 2013 Indian action comedy film, written by Udayakrishna-Siby K. Thomas, directed by Thomson K. Thomas and produced by Anto Joseph. The film features Mammootty and Dileep in the title roles with Rima Kallingal, Karthika Nair, Baburaj and others in supporting roles. Tamil film actor Dhanush makes a cameo appearance as himself.

Plot 
Kammath and Kammath is a film about two brothers, Raja Raja Kammath (Kammath Sr.) and Deva Raja Kammath (Kammath Jr.), and a business endeavor that changed their lives forever. The Kammath brothers initially started making and selling dosa (savory South Indian crêpes) at a small stand to support their poor family. Eventually, their dosa received critical acclaim, and their stand grew into a restaurant, which grew into dozens of restaurants across South India.
Sulaiman Sahib who is their rival, blocks the entry of Kammath Sr. He runs a non-vegetarian restaurant that is opposite a now defunct Brahmin vegetarian restaurant. He has a target of acquiring this restaurant's land.

The Kammath brothers plan to inaugurate their new restaurant in the building and land of the defunct restaurant. On opening day, municipal secretary Mahalakshmi and ward counselor Sebastian Kuzhivelil are brought by Sulaiman Sahib to stop it from opening. They fail because the restaurant's name is now Kammath & Kammath and it has obtained a new license and ownership.

Sulaiman Sahib, with the help of a thief tosses stones and breaks Mahalakshmi's windows and frames Kammath Sr for the crime, resulting in him being arrested and he subsequently meets his brother Kammath Jr. in prison after he had been arrested for allegedly selling liquor illegally in their new restaurant.
The Kammath Brothers threaten Pathrose in the police station and the truth is revealed that he has thrown stones at Mahalakshmi's house that neighbours the Kammaths' house at the request of Sulaiman Sahib and Sebastian Kuzhivelil. The restaurant security cameras reveal that people sent by Sulaiman Sahib brought the liquor to the restaurant to implicate Kammath Jr.

Later, both Mahalakshmi and Sulaiman Sahib are convinced by the elder Kammath that they are not problem makers and both become friends with them.
The Kammaths open their new restaurant in Coimbatore with superstar Dhanush as inaugurator. One night, Sunnichan, attacks Mahalakshmi, asking about his sister, while she was coming back to Palakkad from Coimbatore. The elder Kammath saves her from Sunnichan by sending chauffeur/bodyguard Gopi to deal with him.
On this journey Kammath and Mahalakshmi go to a restaurant. There Kammath meets his old wife with her new husband.

While continuing the journey a flashback reveals that she was his wife, but she had a different nature than the Kammath family had expected. One day when Kammath's father suffers from chest pain, his mother asks her to drive him to hospital. She refuses as she had just applied Mehndi and wanted it to dry. His father passes away. Kammath Sr. realizes they are incompatible and divorce. Mahalakshim pities him after hearing the story.

The next day Kammath is invited by Mahalakshmi to talk about a problem. She introduces her sister Surekha to Kammath and says Surekha is scared that somebody is following her. The next day Kammath fights with a helmeted person who comes near her. When the helmet is removed Kammath sees his brother Deva. He becomes sad as he realises that he has beaten up his own brother. When they all leave another person with a helmet who was following her arrives.

Raja Raja Kammath proceeds with the idea of his brother marrying Surekha. Mahalakshmi tells them that Surekha is actually her deceased brother's wife and a Christian instead of a Hindu. Surekha's history is revealed by Mahalakshmi. Her brother Suresh had married her years ago despite opposition from her family. On the first night of marriage Suresh is killed by Vikram her family's henchman. He is Surekha's real stalker. The story reveals that Sunnichan is her brother. Even after knowing this story Deva Raja Kammath wishes to marry her. Later at her home, the Kammaths realise to their shock that Surekha cannot speak. Deva still wants to marry her.

On the night before the wedding, Deva is accosted by Vikram and Surekha's brothers. He escapes to a godown where the elder Kammath awaits. A fight ensues. The next day the villains are handed over to the police at Surekha's home and Deva marries Surekha. To everyone's surprise Mahalakshmi is married by the groom found by her deceased brother Suresh.

Cast 

 Mammootty as Raja Raja Kammath
 Dileep as Deva Raja Kammath
 Baburaj as Gopi
 Rima Kallingal as Mahalakshmi, Municipal Secretary, younger sister of Suresh
 Karthika Nair as Surekha, widow of Suresh, who later marries Deva.
 Santhosh as DYSP George
 Rajalakshmi as Raja Raja Kammath and Deva Raja Kammath's mother
 Rizabawa as Sulaiman Sahib
 Suraj Venjaramoodu as Sebastien Kuzhiveli, Municipal councillor
 Sukumari as Surekha's grandmother
 Deepak Jethi as Vikram Chhetri
 Spadikam George as Varkeychan
 Shiju as Sunnichan
 Joju George as Tomichan
 Kalabhavan Shajon as Pathrose
 Janardhanan as Thirumeni
 Sadiq as Inspector
 Manu Nair as Inspector
 Ambika Mohan as Maheshwari
 Bindu Ramakrishnan as Thirumeni's wife, Karthyayani
 Thesni Khan as Shantha, Mahalakshmi’s Home maid.
 Balachandran Chullikadu as father of Raja Raja Kammath & Deva Raja Kammath.
 Rajeev Parameshwar as Mahalakshmi's bride
 Vishnupriya as Thirumeni's Daughter
 Deepika Mohan
 Abu Salim as goonda
Kamna Jethmalani
 Vishnu Unnikrishnan as young thief

Cameo appearances 
 Narain as Suresh, an Indian Revenue Service officer. Brother of Mahalakshmi. Husband of Sulekha, who gets murdered at wedding night
 Vidya Pradeep as Radhika, Raja Raja Kammath's ex-wife
 Dhanush as himself on Inauguration of Kammath & Kammath hotel in Coimbatore and on wedding eve party.
 Udaykrishna & Sibi K. Thomas as themselves in "Dosa Dosa" song

Production 

Mammootty was chosen to play a prominent character. The character of his brother in the film was originally chosen as Jayaram but schedule conflicts led Dileep to replace him. Kunchacko Boban had been approached for the role of Income tax officer, but he opted out, again due to schedule conflicts. Dhanush was chosen to play a star who comes to Kerala to inaugurate the restaurant.
Most of the scenes from the film were shot in Cochin.

Music

Release

Theatrical
The film was shown in additional theatres where Vishwaroopam had been banned from being released.

Satellite Rights 

Reception

Critical response
Paresh C Palicha of Rediff.com rated the film 4.25/5 describing it as an "atrocity on the viewer."
IndiaGlitz.com gave 7/10 for the movie and stated "These Kammath brothers are strictly for those who relish masala entertainers" but it gave a positive review of the songs.

Sify.com gave the overall summary of the film as "tedious" and their review says that "only Baburaj manages to make the viewers laugh" and that "There is no credible storyline that is worth mentioning and the script lacks any imagination or depth."
The Times of India gave a rating of 3/5 for the movie, stating "Mammootty and Dileep, gifted actors they are, put together their best to salvage what can be called as a sloppy narrative strewn with drab characters."

Dalton L of Deccan Chronicle says "Rather than preparing an action-romcom out of leftovers, the director ought to have demanded an original recipe and organic vegetables. It's very sad to see the great Mammootty unendingly swimming in stale soup."

Box office
The film had a good collection in the first weekend. Made on a budget of ₹7.5 crore. The film collected ₹10.53 lakhs from five weeks in United Kingdom box office. It collected  worldwide.

References

External links
 

2013 films
2010s Malayalam-language films
Films scored by M. Jayachandran
2013 action comedy films
Indian action comedy films
Films shot in Kochi
Films shot in Palakkad
Films shot in Coimbatore
2013 comedy films